In modern usage, hijab refers to fully covering ones body (the figure is not able to be seen). Many Muslims believe it is obligatory for every Muslim who has reached the age of puberty to wear a hijab. While a hijab can come in many forms, hijab often specifically refers to a clothing, which covers the whole body. Females are usually obligated to cover their whole body except their face, hands or feet. Males may also have a hijab, which consists of covering their torso upto their knees. However, some Muslims maintain that the practice of covering the hair with a hijab is not mandated in Islam.

The term  was originally used to denote a partition, a curtain, or was sometimes used for the Islamic rules of modesty. This is the usage in the verses of the Qur'an, in which the term hijab sometimes refers to a curtain separating visitors to Muhammad's main house from his wives' residential lodgings. This has led some to claim that the mandate of the Qur'an applied only to the wives of Muhammad, and not to the entirety of women. Another interpretation can also refer to the seclusion of women from men in the public sphere, whereas a metaphysical dimension may refer to "the veil which separates man, or the world, from God".

The Qur'an instructs Muslim women and men to dress modestly, and for some, the hijab is worn by Muslim girls and women to maintain modesty and privacy from unrelated males. According to the Encyclopedia of Islam and Muslim World, modesty concerns both men's and women's "gaze, gait, garments, and genitalia".

According to the understanding of the "oldest legal systems", only the wives of Muhammad were those who were instructed to hijab with the verse (33:59), and none of them had a condition for women to cover. Despite this, all orthodox sharia schools ordered that parts of the body, especially the neck, ankles, and under the elbows, be covered in public. There is no consensus among those who consider the subject as a necessity, such as how much of the veil is a necessity. Some legal systems accept the hijab as an order to cover everything except the face and hands while others accept it as an order that covers the whole body, including the face and hands.

These guidelines are found in texts of hadith and fiqh developed after the revelation of the Qur'an. Some believe these are derived from the verses (ayahs) referencing hijab in the Qur'an; others believe that the Qur'an does not mandate that women need to wear a hijab. According to hadith a woman must cover her full body along with face and hands, but it is permissible for a woman to keep her hands and face uncovered. In addition, the dress code of concubines in Sharia law is completely different from that of free women.

Some religious groups consider the issue of veiling in Islam only as a recommendation made according to the conditions of the past, and they believe that giving it as a necessity is an imposition of an Islamist ideology. The Muslim Reform Movement emphasized that the jilbāb and khimar mentioned in the Qur'an are pre-Islamic clothing, they were not brought by the Qur'an, the hijab of the Qur'an never means a headscarf, and the Qur'an only advises on how to wear them.

The hijab is currently required by law to be worn by women in Iran, Afghanistan and the Indonesian province of Aceh. It is no longer required by law in Saudi Arabia since 2018, although Crown Prince Mohammad bin Salman has stated that women, similar to other Gulf countries, must still wear "decent and respectful attire". In Gaza, Palestinian jihadists belonging to the Unified Leadership (UNLU) have rejected a hijab policy for women. They have also targeted those who seek to impose the hijab. Other countries, both in Europe and in the Muslim world, have passed laws banning some or all types of hijab in public or in certain types of locales. Women in different parts of the world have also experienced unofficial pressure to wear or not wear a hijab. The Muslim Reform Movement holds that hijab of the Qur'an simply meant "barrier" and that it was used in the context of both men and women; the jilbab and the khimar were pre-Islamic clothes and the Qur'an simply recommended how to wear these, rather than imposing a new clothing requirement.

When pre-Islamic Arabs went to war, Arab women would open their breasts while fighting or to encourage men to fight, as exemplified by the behavior exhibited by Meccan women in the Battle of Uhud. Considering the verse in Qur'an 24:31, which states that they should cover their "adornments" and not show them to strangers outside the family, it can be thought that the Qur'an introduces a new scale of chastity in the public sphere. Such behavior is seen by Islamic scholars and the Muslim public as a symbol of ignorance.

The use of the hijab has been on the rise worldwide since the 1970s and is viewed by many Muslims as expressing modesty and faith.

In Islamic scripture

Qur'an
Qur'anic verses relating to dress codes use the terms khimār (according to some, a headcovering) and jilbāb (a dress or cloak) rather than ḥijāb. About six verses refer specifically to the way a woman should dress and walk in public; Muslim scholars have differed as to how these verses should be applied, with some stating that a headscarf is required and others saying that a headscarf is not required.

The clearest verses on the requirement of modest dress are Surah 24:30–31, telling both men and women to dress and act modestly, with more detail about modest dress focused on women.

The word khimar, in the context of this verse, is sometimes translated as "head coverings". Such head coverings were worn by women in Arabia at the advent of Islam.

The verse in Luxenberg's reading of Syro-Aramaic reading instructed women to "fasten their belts around their waists" metaphorically instead. The belt had a symbolic meaning for chastity in the Christian world at that time. 

Qur'an 33:59, tells Muhammad ask his family members and other Muslim women to wear outer garments when they go out, so that they are not harassed:

The Islamic commentators generally agree this verse refers to sexual harassment of women of Medina. It is also seen to refer to a free woman, for which Tabari cites Ibn Abbas. Ibn Kathir states that the jilbab distinguishes free Muslim women from those of Jahiliyyah, so other men know they are free women and not slaves or prostitutes, indicating covering oneself does not apply to non-Muslims. He cites Sufyan al-Thawri as commenting that while it may be seen as permitting looking upon non-Muslim women who adorn themselves, it is not allowed in order to avoid lust. Al-Qurtubi concurs with Tabari about this ayah being for those who are free. He reports that the correct view is that a jilbab covers the whole body. He also cites the Sahabah as saying it is no longer than a rida (a shawl or a wrapper that covers the upper body). He also reports a minority view which considers the niqab or head-covering as jilbab. Ibn Arabi considered that excessive covering would make it impossible for a woman to be recognised which the verse mentions, though both Qurtubi and Tabari agree that the word recognition is about distinguishing free women.

Some scholars like Ibn Hayyan, Ibn Hazm and Muhammad Nasiruddin al-Albani questioned the ayah's common explanation. Hayyan believed that "believing women" referred to both free women and slaves as the latter are bound to more easily entice lust and their exclusion is not clearly indicated. Hazm too believed that it covered Muslim slaves as it would violate the law of not molesting a slave or fornication with her like that with a free woman. He stated that anything not attributed to Muhammad should be disregarded.

The word ḥijāb in the Qur'an refers not to women's clothing, but rather a spatial partition or curtain. Sometimes its use is literal, as in the verse which refers to the screen that separated Muhammad's wives from the visitors to his house (33:53), while in other cases the word denotes separation between deity and mortals (42:51), wrongdoers and righteous (7:46, 41:5), believers and unbelievers (17:45), and light from darkness (38:32).

The interpretations of the ḥijāb as separation can be classified into three types: as visual barrier, physical barrier, and ethical barrier. A visual barrier (for example, between Muhammad's family and the surrounding community) serves to hide from sight something, which places emphasis on a symbolic boundary. A physical barrier is used to create a space that provides comfort and privacy for individuals, such as elite women. An ethical barrier, such as the expression purity of hearts in reference to Muhammad's wives and the Muslim men who visit them, makes something forbidden.

Hadith

The hadith sources specify the details of hijab (Islamic rules of dress) for men and women, exegesis of the Qur'anic verses narrated by sahabah, and are a major source which Muslim legal scholars used to derive their rulings.
It was narrated by Aisha, that when  was revealed,

A similar hadith is Abū Dawud , which describes that, in response to the verses, "the women of Ansar came out as if they had crows hanging down over their heads." Although these narrations refers to black clothing ("crows on their heads"), other narrations indicate wives of the prophet also wore other colours like yellow or rose. 
Other hadith on hijab include:
 Narrated Safiya bint Shaiba: "Aisha used to say: 'When (the Verse): "They should draw their veils (khimaar) over their breasts (juyyub)," was revealed, (the ladies) cut their waist sheets at the edges and veiled themselves with the cut pieces.'" , . This hadith is often translated as "...and covered their heads and faces with the cut pieces of cloth," as the Arabic word used in the text could include or exclude the face and there was ikhtilaf on whether covering the face is farḍ, or obligatory. The most prominent sharh, or explanation, of Sahih Bukhari is Fatḥ al-Bārī which states this included the face.
 Yahya related to me from Malik from Muhammad ibn Zayd ibn Qunfudh that his mother asked Umm Salama, the wife of the Prophet, may Allah bless him and grant him peace, "What clothes can a woman wear in prayer?" She said, "She can pray in the khimār (headscarf) and the diri' that reaches down and covers the top of her feet." Muwatta Imam Malik book 8 hadith 37.
 Aishah narrated that Allah's Messenger said: "The Salat (prayer) of a woman who has reached the age of menstruation is not accepted without a khimār." Jami` at-Tirmidhi 377.

Dress code

Modern Muslim scholars usually require women to cover everything but their hands and face in public, but do not require the niqab (a face covering worn by some Muslim women). In nearly all Muslim cultures, young girls are not required to wear a hijab.

Sunni

The four major Sunni schools of thought (Hanafi, Shafi'i, Maliki and Hanbali) hold by consensus that it is obligatory for women to cover their hair, and the entire body except her hands and face, while in the presence of people of the opposite sex other than close family members.

According to Hanafis and other scholars , these requirements extend to being around non-Muslim women as well, for fear that they may describe her physical features to unrelated men. The Sunni Permanent Committee for Islamic Research and Issuing Fatwas in Saudi Arabia, and Muhammad ibn Adam Al-Kawthari also believe women should cover their head.

Men must cover from their belly buttons to their knees, though the schools differ on whether this includes covering the navel and knees or only what is between them.

It is recommended that women wear clothing that is not form fitting to the body, such as modest forms of Western clothing (long shirts and skirts), or the more traditional jilbāb, a high-necked, loose robe that covers the arms and legs. A khimār or shaylah, a scarf or cowl that covers all but the face, is also worn in many different styles.

Shia

The major and most important Shia hadith collections such as Nahj Al-Balagha and Kitab Al-Kafi for the most part do not give any details about hijab requirements. However, a quotation from Man La Yahduruhu al-Faqih Musa al-Kadhim in reply to his brother, makes reference to female hijab requirements during the salat (prayer), stating "She covers her body and head with it then prays. And if her feet protrude from beneath, and she doesn't have the means to prevent that, there is no harm". In Shia jurisprudence, by consensus, it is obligatory for women to cover their hair, and the entire body except her hands and face, while in the presence of people of the opposite sex other than close family members.

Miscellaneous
In private, and in the presence of close relatives (mahrams), rules on dress relax. However, in the presence of the husband, most scholars stress the importance of mutual freedom and pleasure of the husband and wife.

Traditional scholars had differences of opinion on covering the hands and face. The majority adopted the opinion that the face and hands are not part of their nakedness. Some held the opinion that covering the face is recommended if the woman's beauty is so great that it is distracting and causes temptation or public discord.

Alternative views

Along with scriptural arguments, Leila Ahmed argues that head covering should not be interpreted as being compulsory in Islam because the veil predates the revelation of the Qur'an. Head covering was introduced into Arabia long before Muhammad, primarily through Arab contacts with Syria and Iran, where the hijab was a sign of social status. After all, only a woman who need not work in the fields could afford to remain secluded and veiled.

Among Ahmed's arguments is that while some Qur'anic verses enjoin women in general to "draw their Jilbabs (overgarment or cloak) around them to be recognized as believers and so that no harm will come to them" and "guard their private parts ... and drape down khimar over their breasts [when in the presence of unrelated men]", they urge modesty. The word khimar refers to a piece of cloth that covers the head, or headscarf. While the term "hijab" was originally anything that was used to conceal, it became used to refer to concealing garments worn by women outside the house, specifically the headscarf or khimar.

According to at least three authors (Karen Armstrong, Reza Aslan and Leila Ahmed), the stipulations of the hijab were originally meant only for Muhammad's wives, and were intended to maintain their inviolability. This was because Muhammad conducted all religious and civic affairs in the mosque adjacent to his home:

According to Ahmed:

They argue that the term darabat al-hijab ('taking the veil') was used synonymously and interchangeably with "becoming Prophet Muhammad's wife", and that during Muhammad's life, no other Muslim woman wore the hijab. Aslan suggests that Muslim women started to wear the hijab to emulate Muhammad's wives, who are revered as "Mothers of the Believers" in Islam, and states "there was no tradition of veiling until around 627 C.E." in the Muslim community.

Another interpretation differing from the traditional states that a veil is not compulsory in front of blind men and men lacking physical desire (i.e., asexuals and hyposexuals).

Many scholars argue that these contemporary views and arguments, however, contradict the hadith sources, the classical scholars, exegesis sources, historical consensus, and interpretations of the companions (such as Aisha and Abdullah ibn Masud). Some traditionalist Muslim scholars accept the contemporary views and arguments as those hadith sources are not sahih and ijma would no longer be applicable if it is argued by scholars (even if it is argued by only one scholar). Notable examples of traditionalist Muslim scholars who accept these contemporary views include the Indonesian scholar Buya Hamka.

Contemporary practice

The styles and practices of hijab vary widely across the world.
 

An opinion poll conducted in 2014 by The University of Michigan's Institute for Social Research asked residents of seven Muslim-majority countries (Egypt, Iraq, Lebanon, Tunisia, Turkey, Pakistan, and Saudi Arabia) which style of women's dress they considered to be most appropriate in public. The survey found that the headscarf (in its tightly- or loosely-fitting form) was chosen by the majority of respondents in Egypt, Iraq, Tunisia and Turkey. In Saudi Arabia, 63% gave preference to the niqab face veil; in Pakistan the niqab, the full-length chador robe and the headscarf, received about a third of the votes each; while in Lebanon half of the respondents in the sample (which included Christians and Druze) opted for no head covering at all. The survey found "no significant difference" in the preferences between surveyed men and women, except in Pakistan, where more men favoured conservative women's dress. However, women more strongly support women's right to choose how to dress. People with university education are less conservative in their choice than those without one, and more supportive of women's right to decide their dress style, except in Saudi Arabia.

Some fashion-conscious women have been turning to non-traditional forms of hijab such as turbans. While some regard turbans as a proper head cover, others argue that it cannot be considered a proper Islamic veil if it leaves the neck exposed.

 
In Iran, where wearing the hijab is legally required, many women push the boundaries of the state-mandated dress code, risking a fine or a spell in detention. The former Iranian president Hassan Rouhani had vowed to rein in the morality police and their presence on the streets has decreased since he took office, but the powerful conservative forces in the country have resisted his efforts, and the dress codes are still being enforced, especially during the summer months. After Ebrahim Raisi became president, he started imposing hijab laws strictly, announcing use of facial recognition in public transport to enforce hijab law. An Iranian woman, Mahsa Amini, died in custody of 'morality police' after they arrested her on new stricter hijab laws, which led to widespread protests.

In Turkey the hijab was formerly banned in private and state universities and schools. The ban applied not to the scarf wrapped around the neck, traditionally worn by Anatolian peasant women, but to the head covering pinned neatly at the sides, called türban in Turkey, which has been adopted by a growing number of educated urban women since the 1980s. As of the mid-2000s, over 60% of Turkish women covered their head outside home, though only 11% wore a türban. The ban was lifted from universities in 2008, from government buildings in 2013, and from schools in 2014.

The hijab is also a common cultural practice for Muslims in the West. For example, according to a Pew Research Center survey, among the roughly 1 million Muslim women living in the U.S., 43% regularly wear headscarves, while about a half do not cover their hair. In another Pew Research Center poll (from 2011), 36% of Muslim American women reported wearing the hijab whenever they were in public, with an additional 24% saying they wear it most or some of the time, while 40% said they never wore the headcover.

History

Pre-Islamic veiling practices

Veiling did not originate with the advent of Islam. Statuettes depicting veiled priestesses date back as far as 2500 BC. Elite women in ancient Mesopotamia and in the Byzantine, Greek, and Persian empires wore the veil as a sign of respectability and high status. In ancient Mesopotamia, Assyria had explicit sumptuary laws detailing which women must veil and which women must not, depending upon the woman's class, rank, and occupation in society. Female slaves and prostitutes were forbidden to veil and faced harsh penalties if they did so. Veiling was thus not only a marker of aristocratic rank, but also served to "differentiate between 'respectable' women and those who were publicly available".

Strict seclusion and the veiling of matrons were also customary in ancient Greece. Between 550 and 323 BCE, prior to Christianity, respectable women in classical Greek society were expected to seclude themselves and wear clothing that concealed them from the eyes of strange men. Roman pagan custom included the practice of the head covering worn by the priestesses of Vesta (Vestal Virgins). 

It is not clear whether the Hebrew Bible contains prescriptions with regard to veiling, but rabbinic literature presents it as a question of modesty (tzniut). Modesty became an important rabbinic virtue in the early Roman period, and it may have been intended to distinguish Jewish women from their non-Jewish counterparts in Babylonian and later in Greco-Roman society. According to rabbinical precepts, married Jewish women have to cover their hair (cf. Mitpaḥat). The surviving representations of veiled Jewish women may reflect general Roman customs rather than particular Jewish practices. According to Fadwa El Guindi, at the inception of Christianity, Jewish women were veiling their heads and faces. 

The best-known view on Christian headcovering is delineated in the Bible within the passage in 1 Corinthians 11:4-7, which states that "every woman who prays or prophesies with her head uncovered dishonors her head". The early Church Fathers, including Tertullian of Carthage, Clement of Alexandria, Hippolytus of Rome, John Chrysostom and Augustine of Hippo attested in their writings that Christian women should wear a headcovering, while men should pray with their heads uncovered. There is archaeological evidence demonstrating that headcovering was observed as an ordinance by women in early Christianity, and the practice of Christian headcovering continues among female adherents of many Christian denominations today, especially among Anabaptist Christians, as well as among certain Eastern Orthodox Christians, Oriental Orthodox Christians and Reformed Christians, among others.

In the Indian subcontinent, Hindu women cover their heads with a veil in a practice known as ghoonghat.

Intermixing of populations resulted in a convergence of the cultural practices of Greek, Persian, and Mesopotamian empires and the Semitic peoples of the Middle East. Veiling and seclusion of women appear to have established themselves among Jews and Christians before spreading to urban Arabs of the upper classes and eventually among the urban masses. In the rural areas it was common to cover the hair, but not the face.

According to Leila Ahmed, the rigid norms pertaining to veiling and seclusion of women found in Christian Byzantine literature have been influenced by ancient Persian traditions, and there is evidence to suggest that they differed significantly from actual practice. Leila Ahmed argues that "Whatever the cultural source or sources, a fierce misogyny was a distinct ingredient of Mediterranean and eventually Christian thought in the centuries immediately preceding the rise of Islam." Ahmed interprets veiling and segregation of sexes as an expression of a misogynistic view of shamefulness of sex which focused most intensely on shamefulness of the female body and danger of seeing it exposed.

During Muhammad's lifetime

Available evidence suggests that veiling was not introduced into Arabia by Muhammad, but already existed there, particularly in the towns, although it was probably not as widespread as in the neighbouring countries such as Syria and Palestine. Similarly to the practice among Greeks, Romans (Byzantines), Jews, and Assyrians, its use was associated with high social status. In the early Islamic texts, term hijab does not distinguish between veiling and seclusion, and can mean either "veil" or "curtain". The only verses in the Qur'an that specifically reference women's clothing are those promoting modesty, instructing women to guard their private parts and draw their scarves over their breast area in the presence of men. The contemporary understanding of the hijab dates back to Hadith when the "verse of the hijab" descended upon the community in 627 CE. Now documented in Sura 33:53, the verse states, "And when you ask [his wives] for something, ask them from behind a partition. That is purer for your hearts and their hearts". This verse, however, was not addressed to women in general, but exclusively to Muhammad's wives. As Muhammad's influence increased, he entertained more and more visitors in the mosque, which was then his home. Often, these visitors stayed the night only feet away from his wives' apartments. It is commonly understood that this verse was intended to protect his wives from these strangers. During Muhammad's lifetime the term for donning the veil, darabat al-hijab, was used interchangeably with "being Muhammad's wife".

Later pre-modern history
The practice of veiling was borrowed from the elites of the Byzantine and Persian empires, where it was a symbol of respectability and high social status, during the Arab conquests of those empires. Reza Aslan argues that "The veil was neither compulsory nor widely adopted until generations after Muhammad's death, when a large body of male scriptural and legal scholars began using their religious and political authority to regain the dominance they had lost in society as a result of the Prophet's egalitarian reforms".

Because Islam identified with the monotheistic religions of the conquered empires, the practice was adopted as an appropriate expression of Qur'anic ideals regarding modesty and piety. Veiling gradually spread to upper-class Arab women, and eventually it became widespread among Muslim women in cities throughout the Middle East. Veiling of Arab Muslim women became especially pervasive under Ottoman rule as a mark of rank and exclusive lifestyle, and Istanbul of the 17th century witnessed differentiated dress styles that reflected geographical and occupational identities. Women in rural areas were much slower to adopt veiling because the garments interfered with their work in the fields. Since wearing a veil was impractical for working women, "a veiled woman silently announced that her husband was rich enough to keep her idle."

By the 19th century, upper-class urban Muslim and Christian women in Egypt wore a garment which included a head cover and a burqa (muslin cloth that covered the lower nose and the mouth). The name of this garment, harabah, derives from early Christian and Judaic religious vocabulary, which may indicate the origins of the garment itself. Up to the first half of the twentieth century, rural women in the Maghreb and Egypt put on a form of niqab when they visited urban areas, "as a sign of civilization".

Modern history

Western clothing largely dominated fashion in Muslim countries in the 1960s and 1970s. For example, in Pakistan, Afghanistan and Iran, some women wore short skirts, flower printed hippie dresses, flared trousers, and went out in public without the hijab. This changed following the Soviet–Afghan War, military dictatorship in Pakistan, and Iranian revolution of 1979, when traditional conservative attire including the abaya, jilbab and niqab made a comeback. There were demonstrations in Iran in March 1979 after the hijab law, decreeing that women in Iran would have to wear scarves to leave the house, was brought in. However, this phenomenon did not happen in all countries with a significant Muslim population; in Turkey there has been a decline on women wearing the hijab in recent years, although under Erdoğan Turkey is becoming more conservative and Islamic, as Turkey repeals the Atatürk-era hijab ban, and the founding of new fashion companies catering to women who want to dress more conservatively.

In 1953, Egyptian leader President Gamal Abdel Nasser claimed that he was told by the leader of the Muslim Brotherhood organization that they wanted to enforce the wearing of the hijab, to which Nasser responded, "Sir, I know you have a daughter in college, and she doesn't wear a headscarf or anything! Why don't you make her wear the headscarf? So you can't make one girl, your own daughter, wear it, and yet you want me to go and make ten million women wear it?"

The late-twentieth century saw a resurgence of the hijab in Egypt after a long period of decline as a result of westernization. Already in the mid-1970s some college aged Muslim men and women began a movement meant to reunite and rededicate themselves to the Islamic faith. This movement was named the Sahwah, or awakening, and sparked a period of heightened religiosity that began to be reflected in the dress code. 
The uniform adopted by the young female pioneers of this movement was named al-Islāmī (Islamic dress) and was made up of an "al-jilbāb—an unfitted, long-sleeved, ankle-length gown in austere solid colors and thick opaque fabric—and al-khimār, a head cover resembling a nun's wimple that covers the hair low to the forehead, comes under the chin to conceal the neck, and falls down over the chest and back". In addition to the basic garments that were mostly universal within the movement, additional measures of modesty could be taken depending on how conservative the followers wished to be. Some women choose to also utilize a face covering (al-niqāb) that leaves only eye slits for sight, as well as both gloves and socks in order to reveal no visible skin.

Soon this movement expanded outside of the youth realm and became a more widespread Muslim practice. Women viewed this way of dress as a way to both publicly announce their religious beliefs as well as a way to simultaneously reject western influences of dress and culture that were prevalent at the time. Despite many criticisms of the practice of hijab being oppressive and detrimental to women's equality, many Muslim women view the way of dress to be a positive thing. It is seen as a way to avoid harassment and unwanted sexual advances in public and works to desexualize women in the public sphere in order to instead allow them to enjoy equal rights of complete legal, economic, and political status. This modesty was not only demonstrated by their chosen way of dress but also by their serious demeanor which worked to show their dedication to modesty and Islamic beliefs.

Controversy erupted over the practice. Many people, both men and women from backgrounds of both Islamic and non-Islamic faith questioned the hijab and what it stood for in terms of women and their rights. There was questioning of whether in practice the hijab was truly a female choice or if women were being coerced or pressured into wearing it. Many instances, such as the Islamic Republic of Iran's current policy of forced veiling for women, have brought these issues to the forefront and generated great debate from both scholars and everyday people.

As the awakening movement gained momentum, its goals matured and shifted from promoting modesty towards more of a political stance in terms of retaining support for Pan-Islamism and a symbolic rejection of Western culture and norms. Today the hijab means many different things for different people. For Islamic women who choose to wear the hijab it allows them to retain their modesty, morals and freedom of choice. They choose to cover because they believe it is liberating and allows them to avoid harassment. Many people (both Muslim and non-Muslim) are against the wearing of the hijab and argue that the hijab causes issues with gender relations, works to silence and repress women both physically and metaphorically, and have many other problems with the practice. This difference in opinions has generated a plethora of discussion on the subject, both emotional and academic, which continues today.

After the September 11 attacks, the discussion and discourse on the hijab in Western nations intensified as Islamic traditions and theology came under greater scrutiny.

Iran 

In Iran some women act to transform the hijab by challenging the regime subsequently reinventing culture and women's identity within Iran. The female Iranian fashion designer, Naghmeh Kiumarsi, challenges the regime's notion of culture through publicly designing, marketing, and selling clothing pieces that feature tight fitting jeans, and a "skimpy" headscarf. Kiumarsi embodies her own notion of culture and identity and utilizes fashion to value the differences among Iranian women, as opposed to a single identity under the Islamic dress code and welcomes the evolution of Iranian culture with the emergence of new style choices and fashion trends.

Women's resistance in Iran is gaining traction as an increasing number of women challenge the mandatory wearing of the hijab. Smith (2017) addressed the progress that Iranian women have made in her article, "Iran surprises by realizing Islamic dress code for women," published by The Times, a reputable news organization based in the UK. The Iranian government has enforced their penal dress codes less strictly and instead of imprisonment as a punishment have implemented mandatory reform classes in the liberal capital, Tehran. General Hossein Rahimi, the Tehran's police chief stated, "Those who do not observe the Islamic dress code will no longer be taken to detention centers, nor will judicial cases be filed against them" (Smith, 2017). The remarks of Tehran's recent police chief in 2017 reflect political progress in contrast with the remarks of Tehran's 2006 police chief. Iranian women activists have made a headway since 1979 relying on fashion to enact cultural and political change.

Critics of forcing women to wear a headscarf label this practice as Islamofascist.

Around the world

Some governments encourage and even oblige women to wear the hijab, while others have banned it in at least some public settings. In many parts of the world women also experience informal pressure for or against wearing the hijab, including physical attacks.

Legal enforcement

In Gaza, Palestinian jihadists belonging to the Unified Leadership (UNLU) have rejected a hijab policy for women. They have also targeted those who seek to impose the hijab.

Iran went from banning all types of veils in 1936, to making Islamic dress mandatory for women following the Islamic Revolution in 1979. In April 1980, it was decided that women in government offices and educational institutions would be mandated to veil. The 1983 penal code prescribed punishment of 74 lashes for women appearing in public without Islamic hijab (hijab shar'ee), leaving the definition of proper hijab ambiguous.

The same period witnessed tensions around the definition of proper hijab, which sometimes resulted in vigilante harassment of women who were perceived to wear improper clothing. In 1984, Tehran's public prosecutor announced that a stricter dress-code should be observed in public establishments, while clothing in other places should correspond to standards observed by the majority of the people. A new regulation issued in 1988 by the Ministry of the Interior based on the 1983 law further specified what constituted violations of hijab. Iran's current penal code stipulates a fine or 10 days to two months in prison as punishment for failure to observe hijab in public, without specifying its form.

The dress code has been subject of alternating periods of relatively strict and relaxed enforcement over the years, with many women pushing its boundaries, and its compulsory aspect has been a point of contention between conservatives and Hassan Rouhani, who served as president from 2013 until 2021. The United Nations Human Rights Council recently called on Iran to guarantee the rights of those human rights defenders and lawyers supporting anti-hijab protests. In governmental and religious institutions, the dress code requires khimar-type headscarf and overcoat, while in other public places women commonly wear a loosely tied headscarf (rousari). The Iranian government endorses and officially promotes stricter types of veiling, praising it by invoking both Islamic religious principles and pre-Islamic Iranian culture.

The Indonesian province of Aceh requires Muslim women to wear hijab in public. Indonesia's central government granted Aceh's religious leaders the right to impose Sharia in 2001, in a deal aiming to put an end to the separatist movement in the province.

The Kingdom of Saudi Arabia formally requires Muslim women to cover their hair and all women to wear a full-body garment, but it has not been strictly enforced. Saudi women commonly wear the traditional abaya robe, while foreigners sometimes opt for a long coat. These regulations are enforced by the religious police and vigilantes. In 2002, the Saudi religious police were accused by Saudi and international press of hindering the rescue of schoolgirls from a fire because they were not wearing hijabs, which resulted in 15 deaths. In 2018, the Saudi crown prince Mohammad bin Salman told CBS News that Saudi law requires women to wear "decent, respectful clothing", and that women are free to decide what form it should take.

Legal bans

Muslim world 
The tradition of veiling hair in Persian culture has ancient pre-Islamic origins, but the widespread custom was ended by Reza Shah's government in 1936, as the hijab was considered to be incompatible with modernization and he ordered "unveiling" act or Kashf-e hijab. In some cases the police arrested women who wore the veil and would forcibly remove it. These policies had popular support but outraged the Shi'a clerics, to whom appearing in public without their cover was tantamount to nakedness. Some women refused to leave the house out of fear of being assaulted by Reza Shah's police. In 1941, the compulsory element in the policy of unveiling was abandoned.

Turkey had a ban on headscarves at universities until recently. In 2008, the Turkish government attempted to lift a ban on Muslim headscarves at universities, but were overturned by the country's Constitutional Court. In December 2010, however, the Turkish government ended the headscarf ban in universities, government buildings and schools.

In Tunisia, women were banned from wearing the hijab in state offices in 1981; in the 1980s and 1990s, more restrictions were put in place. In 2017, Tajikistan banned hijabs. Minister of Culture Shamsiddin Orumbekzoda told Radio Free Europe that Islamic dress was "really dangerous". Under existing laws, women wearing hijabs are already banned from entering the country's government offices.

Europe 

On 15 March 2004, France passed a law banning "symbols or clothes through which students conspicuously display their religious affiliation" in public primary schools, middle schools, and secondary schools. In the Belgian city of Maaseik, the niqāb has been banned since 2006. On 13 July 2010, France's lower house of parliament overwhelmingly approved a bill that would ban wearing the Islamic full veil in public. It became the first European country to ban the full-face veil in public places, followed by Belgium, Latvia, Bulgaria, Austria, Denmark and some cantons of Switzerland in the following years.

Belgium banned the full-face veil in 2011 in places like parks and on the streets. In September 2013, the electors of the Swiss canton of Ticino voted in favour of a ban on face veils in public areas. In 2016, Latvia and Bulgaria banned the burqa in public places. In October 2017, wearing a face veil became also illegal in Austria. This ban also includes scarves, masks and clown paint that cover faces to avoid discriminating against Muslim dress. In 2016, Bosnia-Herzegovina's supervising judicial authority upheld a ban on wearing Islamic headscarves in courts and legal institutions, despite protests from the Muslim community that constitutes 40% of the country. In 2017, the European Court of Justice ruled that companies were allowed to bar employees from wearing visible religious symbols, including the hijab. However, if the company has no policy regarding the wearing of clothes that demonstrate religious and political ideas, a customer cannot ask employees to remove the clothing item. In 2018, the Danish parliament passed a law banning the full-face veil in public places.

In 2016, more than 20 French towns banned the use of the burqini, a style of swimwear intended to accord with rules of hijab. Dozens of women were subsequently issued fines, with some tickets citing not wearing "an outfit respecting good morals and secularism", and some were verbally attacked by bystanders when they were confronted by the police. Enforcement of the ban also hit beachgoers wearing a wide range of modest attire besides the burqini. Media reported that in one case the police forced a woman to remove part of her clothing on a beach in Nice. The Nice mayor's office denied that she was forced to do so and the mayor condemned what he called the "unacceptable provocation" of wearing such clothes in the aftermath of the Nice terrorist attack.

A team of psychologists in Belgium have investigated, in two studies of 166 and 147 participants, whether the Belgians' discomfort with the Islamic hijab, and the support of its ban from the country's public sphere, is motivated by the defence of the values of autonomy and universalism (which includes equality), or by xenophobia/ethnic prejudice and by anti-religious sentiments. The studies have revealed the effects of subtle prejudice/racism, values (self-enhancement values and security versus universalism), and religious attitudes (literal anti-religious thinking versus spirituality), in predicting greater levels of anti-veil attitudes beyond the effects of other related variables such as age and political conservatism.

In 2019, Austria banned the hijab in schools for children up to ten years of age. The ban was motivated by the equality between men and women and improving social integration with respect to local customs. Parents who send their child to school with a headscarf will be fined 440 euro. The ban was overturned in 2020 by the Austrian Constitutional Court.

In 2019, Staffanstorp Municipality in Sweden banned all veils for school pupils up to sixth grade.

India 

In India, Muslim women are allowed to wear the hijab and/or burqa anytime, anywhere. However, in January 2022, a number of colleges in the South Indian state of Karnataka stopped female students wearing the hijab from entering the campus, following which the state government issued a circular banning 'religious clothes' in educational institutions where uniforms are prescribed. On 15 March 2022, the Karnataka High Court, in a verdict, upheld the hijab ban in educational institutions where uniforms are prescribed, arguing that the practice is non-essential in Islam.

Unofficial pressure to wear hijab

Muslim girls and women have fallen victim to honour killings in both the Western world and elsewhere for refusing to wearing the hijab or for wearing it in a way considered to be improper by the perpetrators.

Successful informal coercion of women by sectors of society to wear the hijab has been reported in Gaza where Mujama' al-Islami, the predecessor of Hamas, reportedly used "a mixture of consent and coercion" to restore' hijab" on urban educated women in Gaza in the late 1970s and 1980s.

Similar behaviour was displayed by Hamas itself during the First Intifada in Palestinian territories. Though a relatively small movement at this time, Hamas exploited the political vacuum left by perceived failures in strategy by the Palestinian factions to call for a "return" to Islam as a path to success, a campaign that focused on the role of women. Hamas campaigned for the wearing of the hijab alongside other measures, including insisting women stay at home, segregation from men and the promotion of polygamy. In the course of this campaign women who chose not to wear the hijab were verbally and physically harassed, with the result that the hijab was being worn "just to avoid problems on the streets".

Wearing of the hijab was enforced by the Taliban regime in Afghanistan. The Taliban required women to cover not only their head but their face as well, because "the face of a woman is a source of corruption" for men not related to them.

In Srinagar, the capital of the Indian state of Jammu and Kashmir, a previously unknown militant group calling itself Lashkar-e-Jabbar claimed responsibility for a series of acid attacks on women who did not wear the burqa in 2001, threatening to punish women who do not adhere to their vision of Islamic dress. Women of Kashmir, most of whom are not fully veiled, defied the warning, and the attacks were condemned by prominent militant and separatist groups of the region.

In 2006, radicals in Gaza have been accused of attacking or threatening to attack the faces of women in an effort to intimidate them from wearing allegedly immodest dress.

In 2014, the Islamic State of Iraq and the Levant was reported to have executed several women for not wearing the niqab with gloves.

In April 2019 in Norway, telecom company Telia received bomb threats after featuring a Muslim woman taking off her hijab in a commercial. Although the police did not evaluate the threat likely to be carried out, delivering threats is still a crime in Norway.

Unofficial pressure against wearing the hijab
In recent years, women wearing the hijab have been subjected to verbal and physical attacks worldwide, particularly following terrorist attacks. Louis A. Cainkar writes that the data suggest that women in hijab rather than men are the predominant target of anti-Muslim attacks, not because they are more easily identifiable as Muslims, but because they are seen to represent a threat to the local moral order that the attackers are seeking to defend. Some women stop wearing the hijab out of fear or following perceived pressure from their acquaintances, but many refuse to stop wearing it out of religious conviction, even when they are urged to do so for self-protection.

Kazakhstan has no official ban on wearing the hijab, but those who wear it have reported that authorities use a number of tactics to discriminate against them.

In 2015, authorities in Uzbekistan organized a "deveiling" campaign in the capital city Tashkent, during which women wearing the hijab were detained and taken to a police station. Those who agreed to remove their hijab were released "after a conversation", while those who refused were transferred to the counterterrorism department and given a lecture. Their husbands or fathers were then summoned to convince the women to obey the police. This followed an earlier campaign in the Fergana Valley.

After the election of Shavkat Mirziyoyev as President of Uzbekistan in December 2016, Muslims were given the opportunity to openly express their religious identity, which manifested itself in the wider spread of hijabs in Uzbekistan. In July 2021, the state allowed the wearing of the hijab in public places.

In Kyrgyzstan in 2016, the government sponsored street banners aiming to dissuade women from wearing the hijab.

Workplace discrimination against hijab-wearing women

The issue of discrimination against Muslims affects Muslim women more due to the hijab making them more identifiable compared to Muslim men. Particularly after the September 11 attacks and the coining of the term Islamophobia, some of Islamophobia's manifestations are seen within the workplace. Women wearing the hijab are at risk of discrimination in their workplace because the hijab helps identify them for anyone who may hold Islamophobic attitudes. Their association with the Islamic faith automatically projects any negative stereotyping of the religion onto them. As a result of the heightened discrimination, some Hijab-wearing Muslim women in the workplace resort to taking off their hijab in hopes to prevent any further prejudice acts.

A number of hijab-wearing women who were interviewed expressed that perceived discrimination also poses a problem for them. To be specific, Muslim women shared that they chose not to wear the headscarf out of fear of future discrimination.

The discrimination hijab-wearing Muslim women face goes beyond affecting their work experience; it also interferes with their decision to uphold religious obligations. As a result, hijab-wearing Muslim women in the United States have worries regarding their ability to follow their religion, because it might mean they are rejected employment. Ali, Yamada, and Mahmoud (2015) state that women of color who also follow the religion of Islam are considered to be in what is called "triple jeopardy", due to being a part of two minority groups subject to discrimination.

A study by Ali et al. (2015) found a relationship between the discrimination Muslims face at work and their job satisfaction. In other words, the discrimination Hijab-wearing Muslim women face at work is associated with their overall feeling of contentment of their jobs, especially compared to other religious groups.

Hijab-wearing Muslim women not only experience discrimination whilst in their job environment; they also experience discrimination in their attempts to get a job. An experimental study conducted on potential hiring discrimination among Muslims found that in terms of overt discrimination there were no differences between Muslim women who wore traditional Islamic clothing and those who did not. However, covert discrimination was noted towards Muslim who wore the hijab, and as a result were dealt with in a hostile and rude manner. While observing hiring practices among 4,000 employers in the U.S, experimenters found that employers who self-identified as Republican tended to avoid making interviews with candidates who appeared Muslim on their social network pages.

One instance that some view as hijab discrimination in the workplace that gained public attention and made it to the Supreme Court was EEOC v. Abercrombie & Fitch. The U.S Equal Employment Opportunity Commission took advantage of its power granted by Title VII and made a case for a young hijabi female who applied for a job, but was rejected due to her wearing a headscarf which violated Abercrombie & Fitch's pre-existing and longstanding policy against head coverings and all black garments.

Discrimination levels differ depending on geographical location; for example, South Asian Muslims in the United Arab Emirates do not perceive as much discrimination as their South Asian counterparts in the U.S. Although, South Asian Muslim women in both locations are similar in describing discrimination experiences as subtle and indirect interactions. The same study also reports differences among South Asian Muslim women who wear the hijab, and those who do not. For non-hijabis, they reported to have experienced more perceived discrimination when they were around other Muslims.

Perceived discrimination is detrimental to well-being, both mentally and physically. However, perceived discrimination may also be related to more positive well-being for the individual. A study in New Zealand concluded that while Muslim women who wore the headscarf did in fact experience discrimination, these negative experiences were overcome by much higher feelings of religious pride, belonging, and centrality.

See also

 Islamic scarf controversy in France
 Merve Kavakçı
 LetUsTalk
 List of religious headgear
 Types of hijab
 Covering variants: cowl, paranja, purdah, tagelmust (worn by men), tudong, yashmak
 Non-Muslim covering: ghoonghat, Christian headcovering, religious habit, tichel

Notes

References

Citations

Sources

 Aslan, Reza, No god but God: The Origins, Evolution, and Future of Islam, Random House, 2005
 
 
 Elver, Hilal. The Headscarf Controversy: Secularism and Freedom of Religion (Oxford University Press; 2012); 265 pages; Criticizes policies that serve to exclude pious Muslim women from the public sphere in Turkey, France, Germany, and the United States.
 
 Yurdakul, Gökce and Anna C. Korteweg. The Headscarf Debates: Conflicts of National Belonging  (Stanford University Press; 2014) Media debates on stigmatizing Muslim women and how Muslim women respond to these critics for the country cases of Germany, Turkey, the Netherlands and France.

External links

"In graphics: Muslim veils." BBC. - Drawings of different types of Islamic women's clothing
ReOrienting the Veil - Website discussing global hijab usage by the University of North Carolina at Chapel Hill

 
Arabic words and phrases in Sharia
Islamic terminology
Modesty in Islam
Articles containing video clips